Manchester is an unincorporated community in Walker County, Alabama, United States.

History
Manchester was founded as a lumber center. The Manchester Lumber Company owned a large amount of the surrounding timber land and built a school and Baptist church for the community. Much of the lumber produced in Manchester was used to make flatboats, which were used to transport coal. For a short time, the Manchester Coal Company mined coal in the area.

A post office operated under the name Manchester from 1907 to 1957.

The Walker County Airport is located in Manchester.

Notes

Unincorporated communities in Walker County, Alabama
Unincorporated communities in Alabama